The 2018 Cavan Intermediate Football Championship was the 54th edition of Cavan GAA's premier Gaelic football tournament for intermediate graded clubs in County Cavan, Ireland. The tournament consists of 14 teams, with the winner representing Cavan in the Ulster Intermediate Club Football Championship.

The championship starts with a league stage and then progresses to a knock out stage.

The draw for the group stages of the championship were made on 30 April 2018.

Mullahoran won the championship, beating Cuchulainns in the final.

Team Changes
The following teams have changed division since the 2017 championship season.

To Championship
Promoted from 2017 Cavan Junior Football Championship
  Ballymachugh  -  (Junior Champions)
Relegated from 2017 Cavan Senior Football Championship
  Arva 
  Cuchulainns
  Mullahoran

From Championship
Promoted to 2018 Cavan Senior Football Championship
  Shercock  -  (Intermediate Champions)
Relegated to 2018 Cavan Junior Football Championship
  Denn
  Drumlane 
  Killinkere

League stage
All 14 teams enter the competition at this stage. A random draw determines which teams face each other in each of the four rounds. No team can meet each other twice in the group stage. The top 8 teams go into a seeded draw for the quarter-finals while the bottom 6 teams will enter a Relegation Playoff.

Round 1

Round 2

Round 3

Round 4

Knock-Out Stage

Quarter-finals

Semi-finals

Final

Relegation play-offs
The teams placed 8-14 in the league phase will play off against each other. The 3 winners will maintain their intermediate status for 2019. One loser will go straight to a relegation final while the other 2 losers will face off in a relegation semi-final. The ultimate loser will be relegated to the 2019 Junior Championship.

References

External links
 Cavan at ClubGAA
 Official Cavan GAA Website

Cavan GAA Football championships
Cavan Intermediate
Cavan IFC